Gomti Nagar is an area in the Indian city of Lucknow consisting of both residential and business settlements. It is one of the largest and fast growing areas of Lucknow. It is also considered as Asia's largest Colony. It is home to high-end  residential projects, malls, commercial property, plots, business centers, multiplexes, cafés, hotels, hospitals, clubs, banks, food courts, entertainment centers. The colonies in Gomti Nagar are based on a 'maximum open space' concept hence most of the plots/houses and apartments are park-facing.

Origin of name 

It is situated on the banks of the river Gomti, a tributary of Ganga, which flows through Lucknow, hence its name Gomti Nagar.

Economy

Gomti Nagar is now developing both as a commercial and IT hub of mainland Lucknow. Till now the Central Lucknow consisting of Hazratganj, Vidhan Sabha Marg & Ashok Marg was the main commercial area.

Realty of Gomti Nagar is growing at the rate of 118%. It has the Software Technology Park, Passport Office, High Court and many other important offices, gaming zones, indoor stadiums and commercial centers.

Many important Government offices like the Reserve Bank of India (RBI), Employees' Provident Fund Organization, Lucknow Metro, PICUP, Office of the CRPF, Custom Division, Institute of Cost and Works Accountants of India, Institute of Chartered Accountants of India, Bharat Sanchar Nigam Limited (BSNL), etc. are situated in Gomti Nagar.

It boasts of National and State level headquarters of SONY, Reliance Retail, Ultratech Cement (Adityabirla Group)   etc. It also has a developed industrial area with several factories and industrial units.

The Sahara City of the Sahara India Pariwar, including the residence of Mr. Subrata Roy, is also located in Gomti Nagar.

Gomti Nagar is divided into
 Gomti Nagar - Phase-I
 Gomti Nagar - Phase - II &
 Gomti Nagar Extension.

Whereas Phase-I & II have good occupancy rates, Gomti Nagar Extension is still under construction.

Gomti Nagar is divided into various sectors known as "Khands" and name of all "Khands" start with letter "V".

Lucknow's prime business establishments and offices are situated in Gomti Nagar.

Leisure

Eight shopping malls/ multiplexes Phoenix Palassio, Wave Mall, Fun Republic Mall, City Mall, Singapore Mall, One Awadh Center,  Platinum Mall and Riverside Mall are situated in Gomti Nagar. The Lulu Mall is under construction on Shaheed Path claim as the biggest mall in India by owner. The mall is spread in 22lakh sq.ft. area. Lulu group invested 2000 Cr. For this.

It is home to a number of restaurants, pubs, cafes and eating joints such as Dastarkhwan, Barbeque Nation, Cafe Coffee Day, McDonald's, Barista, Mainland China, Pizza Hut, Domino's, Royal Cafe,  Cocoberry, Moti Mahal Deluxe, Aryans, JJ Bakers, Mr. Brown, Neelkanth Sweets, Cappuccino Mini Blast, Percussion, Pind Balluchi, Metropolitan Club, Zero Degree, Spice Caves, Vintage Machine, Kareem's, Bati Chokha, The Urban Terrace, Underdoggs and many more.

Patrakarpuram is the busiest market in Gomti Nagar. It is a major shopping and recreational hub and houses restaurants, cafes, shops and food-joints.

Gomti Nagar has three big parks - Ambedkar Park, Janeshwar Mishra Park and Ram Manohar Lohia Park. Janeshwar Mishra Park is the biggest park of Asia sprawling 376 acres of land. It is home to a huge variety of plants and trees. It has the longest jogging and bicycle track in India. It has huge man-made water bodies with fountains. It also houses a real MIG-21 aircraft and a battle tank for public display. A 200 ft. high flag of India is another highlight of this park. The park is eco-friendly owing to its rain-water harvesting and solar electricity setups. A big part of it is open to public and the remaining work is expected to get completed by 2016. The Ambedkar park is a mammoth construction of marble, stones and fountains. It looks marvelous when lit up at night. Lohia Park is popular among morning walkers and fitness addicts as it houses a professional jogging/racing track and an open-air gym.

Marine Drive/River Drive (unofficial name) located on the banks of river Gomti is a crowd-puller during evenings. The musical fountain show organised every evening in a nearby park attracts people from all over the city. The construction of the Riverfront mega project is another highlight of this place. It is an 8 km long project which includes walkways, cycle-tracks, benches, greenery, lighting and beautification of the river banks on both sides. The Gomti Riverfront Project has already been major attraction for tourists and film makers in the city.

Gomti Nagar is home to a number of 5-Star and 4-Star hotels like Taj Vivanta, Renaissance by Marriot, Novotel, Grand JBR, Ranjee's,  Hyatt Regency, Fairfield by Marriot, Comfort Inn, Dayal Paradise, and Hotel Lineage.

Transport

Railways

Gomti Nagar railway station is a railway station which is situated on Barabanki-Lucknow Suburban Railway railway line. Many stations are covered by Lucknow-Kanpur Suburban Railway. It serves daily commuters. Some of the trains are operated from Barabanki city. An expansion of the Gomti Nagar railway station began in 2018, and is expected to be finished by the end of 2020.

Another railway station - Malhaur now falls within Gomti Nagar. The transportation is mainly road based.  It is connected with the city through city bus, autorickshaw etc.

Metro

For the Gomti Nagar Metro link, the train coming from the airport terminal was to be diverted towards Gomti Nagar at the Indira Nagar trisection Polytechnic crossing along an elevated route. The planned stations were Indira Nagar Trisection, West End Mall [Wave Multiplex], Gomti Nagar and Patrakarpuram.

Air

Chaudhary Charan Singh International Airport, Amausi is the nearest airport and is directly connected by air with international destinations include Dubai, Muscat, Sharjah, Dammam, Jeddah, Singapore, Bangkok.

Education 

Gomti Nagar has some of the city's professional institutes, colleges, schools, coaching and test preparation institutes.

Professional institutes
Institute of Cost Accountants of India
Institute of Company Secretaries of India
Institute of Chartered Accountants of India

Colleges
College of Innovative Management And Science (CIMS) Vipul Khand Gomti Nagar.
BBD Group of Colleges and University
Amity University, Lucknow
Institute of Management Research and Technology 
Jaipuria Institute of Management
 IMRT Business School
National School of Management & Governance
 Dr. Ram Manohar Lohia Institute of Medical Sciences
Bhartendu Natya Academy(BNA)
ICFAI
IILM Academy of Higher Learning

Schools
L'école du monde (French School meaning School of the World)
St. Francis School
City Montessori School
Seth M.R.Jaipuria School, Lucknow
Kendriya Vidyalaya
Lucknow Public School
Study Hall School
Bharatiya Vidya Bhavan
Red Rose Sr. Secondary School
Modern Academy
Scholar's Home
Riverside Academy
St John Bosco College
Immaculate Conception Convent School
 Amity International School, Lucknow
 Modern School
 St. Don Bosco College
 St. Mary's College
 Jagran Public School
Annie Besant College
Almighty Montessori Inter College
 SKD Academy (Vikrant Khand Branch)
 Rani Laxmibai College
St. Columbus Inter College
Police Modern School
St. Peter's School
St. Xavier's Convent School
Maharaja Agrasen Public School
T D Girls Inter College

Sports

Cricket, football, badminton, golf, and hockey are among the most popular sports in the area. It is home to Babu Banarasi Das Badminton Academy, which is situated near Lohia Park.The construction of Ekana Sports Stadium, which also consists of Bharat Ratna Shri Atal Bihari Vajpayee Ekana International Cricket stadium, has been completed.In November 2018, an international T20 match was played between Indian and West Indies in which India emerged victorious.

References

External links 
 Lucknow Development Authority 

Neighbourhoods in Lucknow